Butrinti is a Damen Stan 4207 patrol vessel of the Albanian Naval Force, built at the Pashaliman Naval Base. She is used to perform a number of tasks and duties, including coastal patrol, search and rescue, control and monitoring of maritime traffic, marine environment protection. She is also used in joint operations between Albania and other European countries.

History

Butrinti was launched in 2014. The sailors from  visited the ship in 2015 as part of a joint public relations exercise.

References

Iliria-class patrol vessels
2014 ships